Ion Vasile Oană (born 23 July 1972 in Târgu Lăpuş) is a Romanian retired football player, who played as a striker. Playing for Gloria Bistriţa, he was the top goalscorer of 1997–98 Divizia A alongside Constantin Barbu with 21 goals each. He scored 32 goals in over 100 matches in Liga I. Oană also played abroad in Turkey at Ankaragücü and Maccabi Kiryat Gat in Israel. He coached Liga IV team Someşul Ulmeni, and now he coaches one of the FC Baia Mare junior teams.

References

1972 births
Living people
People from Târgu Lăpuș
Romanian footballers
Association football forwards
ACF Gloria Bistrița players
MKE Ankaragücü footballers
Maccabi Kiryat Gat F.C. players
Liga I players
Süper Lig players
Expatriate footballers in Israel
Expatriate footballers in Turkey
Romanian expatriate footballers
Romanian football managers